Daniel Gustavo Ruiz (born April 13, 1984) is an Argentinian football striker playing in Atletico Marte.

External links
Daniel Gustavo Ruiz at playmakerstats.com (English version of ceroacero.es)

Living people
1984 births
Argentine footballers
Argentine expatriate footballers
Association football forwards
Expatriate footballers in El Salvador
Argentino de Rosario footballers
Footballers from Rosario, Santa Fe